The 1990 Nations motorcycle Grand Prix was the fourth race of the 1990 Grand Prix motorcycle racing season. It took place on the weekend of 18–20 May 1990 at the Misano circuit.

500 cc race report
In practice Christian Sarron falls in front of Wayne Gardner, bringing him down and causing Gardner to race with broken ribs.

At the first turn, Wayne Rainey and Kevin Schwantz go first, but Pierfrancesco Chili gets knocked off by Gardner, who came across the racing line. Chili kicks furiously at the gravel as he's escorted off the track.

A trio forms at the front: Rainey, Schwantz and Mick Doohan. Alex Barros crashes out for a second race in a row.

Drops of rain bring out the red flag and memories of Spa ’89, when 3 races were run; a second race on aggregate time will follow. New start in the dry and Doohan gets the first turn, followed by Rainey and Mamola. It soon turns into Rainey, Doohan, Gardner and Schwantz at the front. It’s a very aggressive group of four, who pass each other two at a time.

Schwantz takes the lead, and can’t suppress his tic of looking back while exiting on the throttle, a habit that caused him a crash last season.

Though the order crossing the line is Schwantz, Gardner, Rainey and Doohan, Rainey takes the win based on aggregate time.

500 cc classification

References

Italian motorcycle Grand Prix
Nations
Nations